John H. O'Donnell (May 12, 1890 - May 9, 1968) served in the California State Assembly for the 3rd district and during World War I he served in the United States Army.

References

External links
Join California John H. O'Donnell

United States Army personnel of World War I
Democratic Party members of the California State Assembly
20th-century American politicians
1890 births
1968 deaths